Viktor Yevgenyevich Papayev (born 2 March 1947 in Bazarny Karabulak, Saratov Oblast) is a retired Soviet football player and a current Russian coach.

Honours
 Soviet Top League winner: 1969.
 Soviet Cup winner: 1971.

International career
Papayev made his debut for USSR on 6 August 1969 in a friendly against Sweden.

External links
  Profile

1947 births
People from Saratov Oblast
Living people
Soviet footballers
Association football midfielders
Soviet Union international footballers
Russian football managers
FC Spartak Moscow players
FC Fakel Voronezh players
PFC CSKA Moscow players
Russian footballers
FC Fakel Voronezh managers
FC Rotor Volgograd managers
FC Khimki managers
FC Sokol Saratov players
Soviet Top League players
Russian Premier League managers
FC Arsenal Tula managers
FC Znamya Truda Orekhovo-Zuyevo players
Sportspeople from Saratov Oblast